Dimitra may refer to:

People
Dimitra Arliss, Greek American actress
Dimitra Asilian, female Greek water polo player
Dimitra Liani, widow of the former Greek Prime Minister Andreas Papandreou
Dimitra Simeonidou, telecommunications engineer

Places in Greece
Dimitra, Arcadia, a village in Arcadia, part of Kontovazaina
Dimitra, Elis, a village in Elis, part of Vartholomio
Dimitra, Grevena, a village in the Grevena regional unit, part of Chasia
Dimitra, Larissa, a village in the Larissa regional unit, part of Lakereia
Dimitra, Serres, a village in the Serres regional unit, part of Nea Zichni